Barbon is a civil parish in the South Lakeland District of Cumbria, England.  It contains 23 listed buildings that are recorded in the National Heritage List for England.  Of these, two are listed at Grade II*, the middle of the three grades, and the others are at Grade II, the lowest grade.  The parish contains the village of Barbon and the surrounding countryside.  The listed buildings consist of houses, farmhouses and farm buildings, bridges, a milestone, a boundary stone, and a church.


Key

Buildings

References

Citations

Sources

Lists of listed buildings in Cumbria